National Highway 154A, commonly called NH 154A is a national highway in  India. It is a spur road of National Highway 54. NH-154A traverses the states of Punjab and Himachal Pradesh in India.

Route 
Chakki, Dhar, Banikhet, Chamba, Bharmour.

Junctions  
 
Terminal with National Highway 154 near Chakki.

See also 
 List of National Highways in India by highway number
 List of National Highways in India by state

References

External links 

 NH 154A on OpenStreetMap

National highways in India
National Highways in Himachal Pradesh
National Highways in Punjab, India